The Menominee Crack is an unusual geological pop-up feature that was created rapidly one morning in October 2010. Located in Menominee, Michigan the crack stretches through the woods, is 361 feet long, over half a meter wide in some places, and up to 1.7 meters deep. In 2013, a group of Michigan Tech researchers led by Joshua Richardson began research on the crack.  The researchers concluded that the crack is the first recorded example of such a popup without an obvious trigger. 
A description and analysis of the event is published in Seismological Research Letters.

References

http://www.csmonitor.com/Science/2016/0211/Michigan-s-bizarre-Menominee-crack-continues-to-baffle-scientists
https://arstechnica.com/science/2016/02/the-earth-cracked-apart-in-a-forest-and-it-made-a-sound/
http://phys.org/news/2016-02-mysterious-menominee-unusual-geological-pop-up.html
http://www.mtu.edu/news/stories/2016/february/menominee-crack-geological-pop-up-structure.html
http://www.natureworldnews.com/articles/19861/20160211/menominee-crack-michigan-researchers-finally-identify-mysterious-pop-up-feature.htm

Geology of Michigan
Menominee County, Michigan